Lionel Leroy, stage name of Yves Martin (15 February 1956 – 20 June 2021) was a French singer.

Biography
Leroy primarily performed for the credits of television series from the late 1970s to the early 1980s. In 2006, he married the singer Sheila. They separated in 2016.

Lionel Leroy died on 20 June 2021 at the age of 65.

Filmography

Television
Wonder Woman (1975)
Starsky & Hutch (1978)
Barrières (1980)
Hart to Hart (1982)
Mr. Merlin (1983)

Animated series
Grendizer (1978)
Ulysses 31 (1981)
 (1982)
Arthur! and the Square Knights of the Round Table (1982, 1985)
Danger Mouse (1982)
Gil et Julie (1983)
X-Bomber (1983)
The Secret of the Selenites (1984)

Discography
Hey Joker (1981)
Le vampire amoureux (1981)
Allez Louise ! (1982)
Femme musique, Perfide Albion (1982)
Blanc ou noir (1984)
Cité de malheur (1984)
Patatras (1984)
Comme dit Lionel Richie (1985)
Complètement fou (1989)

References

1956 births
2021 deaths
20th-century French male singers